Cardington Workmen's Platform was a railway station on the Bedford to Hitchin Line which served the Royal Air Force station near the village of Cardington in Bedfordshire, England. A short-lived halt, it opened during the First World War and closed in 1921.

History 
During the First World War a Royal Air Force station was established in Cardington which substantially increased passenger and freight traffic on the Bedford to Hitchin Line. In order to provide easier access to the airbase, a halt was opened beside the road bridge carrying the Southill Road over the line. After the halt closed to passenger traffic in 1921, numerous sidings were constructed on the site to serve the camp and these were used to receive materials needed for the construction of the R100 and R101 airships. The site was also used during the Second World War for troop specials which enabled conscripts to return home from the RAF camp.

Present day 
Nothing remains of the halt today.

References 

Disused railway stations in Bedfordshire
Former Midland Railway stations
Railway stations in Great Britain opened in 1917
Railway stations in Great Britain closed in 1921
Workmen's Platform railway station